Irk Bitig or Irq Bitig, known as the Book of Omens or Book of Divination in English, is a 9th-century manuscript book on divination that was discovered in the "Library Cave" of the Mogao Caves in Dunhuang, China, by Aurel Stein in 1907, and is now in the collection of the British Library in London, England. The book is written in Old Turkic using the Old Turkic script (also known as "Orkhon" or "Turkic runes"); it is the only known complete manuscript text written in the Old Turkic script. It is also an important source for early Turkic mythology.

British Library manuscript 

The only extant version of the Irk Bitig is a manuscript from the Dunhuang Library Cave that is now held at the British Library (shelfmark ).

The manuscript is in the form of a booklet comprising 58 folios folded in half, each page being about 13.1 × 8.1 cm in size. The pages of the booklet turn to the right (opposite to that of Western books), and the Old Turkic text is laid out in horizontal right-to-left lines running top-to-bottom down the page. The text of Irk Bitig consists of 104 pages in 52 folios (folios 5b–57a), with 40–70 characters per page. The text is written in black ink with red punctuation marks marking word division, except for the colophon on the last two pages, which is written in red ink. The first four and a half folios (including one line overwriting the start of the Old Turkic text) and the last three folios (of which one and a half folios overwrite the Old Turkic colophon) are Buddhist devotional verses written in Chinese. As the Chinese text overwrites the beginning and end of the Old Turkic text, it is believed that the text of Irk Bitig was written first, and that the blank pages at the start and end of the booklet were later filled with the Chinese Buddhist verses.

The title by which the book is known, Irk Bitig, meaning "Book of Omens", is given at the bottom of the last page of the main text (folio 55b), but the author is not mentioned anywhere.

The manuscript text is not precisely dated, but its colophon states that it was written on the 15th day of the second month of the year of the tiger at the Taygüntan Manichaean monastery by an anonymous monk for his "elder brother", General İtaçuk (Saŋun İtaçuk). As the Library Cave was sealed in the early 11th century, it is thought that this year of the tiger must be sometime during the 9th or 10th centuries. Louis Bazin suggests that the year of the tiger could here be 930 or 942, but Gerard Clauson and Talat Tekin both date the manuscript to the 9th century (i.e. one of the years 810, 822, 834, 846, 858, 870, 882 or 894).

A number of transcription errors and textual omissions have been identified in the manuscript text, which suggest that it is not an original composition but a copy of an earlier text that was probably written in the Old Uyghur script. On the basis of its linguistic features, Marcel Erdal has dated the composition of the original work to the 8th and 9th centuries, among the earliest group of Old Turkic texts.

Linguistic features 
According to Annemarie von Gabain (1901–1993) the Irk Bitig is written in a "Manichaean" dialect of Old Turkic, reflecting the fact that it was written at a Manichaean monastery, but Clauson has noted that the language of this text is virtually identical to that of the corpus of secular inscriptions in the Old Turkic script from the Orkhon Valley, and so "Manichaean" is not a valid linguistic term.

The British Library manuscript exhibits a number of orthographic peculiarities that may reflect the dialect of its scribe. In particular, it uses the front vowel forms of the letter s  and n  in certain situations where a back vowel form of the letters would be expected.

The Old Turkic text does not have any sentence punctuation, but uses two black lines in a red circle as a word separation mark in order to indicate word boundaries.

Contents 

The main text of the book comprises 65 sections, each representing a particular divination, which is headed by three groups of between one and four circles filled with red ink.  These three groups of circles are the omen (ırk in Old Turkic) that are the subject of the divination, and are thought to represent the pips on a four-sided dice made from a rectangular piece of wood that would be thrown three times (or three such dice thrown once) as part of the divination ceremony.  The groups of circles are followed by a short explanation of their meaning, such as "I am a white-spotted falcon. I enjoy sitting on a sandal-wood tree" (no.4), "A man comes hurriedly. He comes bringing good tiding" (no.7), and "An old ox was eaten by ants, gnawing around its belly. It lays down without being able to move" (no.37).  After the explanation is a prognostication in the form "Know thus, it is ..." "good" (33 times), "very good" (7 times), "bad" (17 times) or "very bad" (2 times).  In a few cases the prognostication after "know thus" is missing.

There are 64 combinations of three groups of one to four pips, but the book gives a total of sixty-five omens, with some errors, including two missing omens (3-1-1 and 1-2-4) and some duplicate omens (3-4-1 occurs three times, and 3-1-3 occurs twice).

The omens comprise short stories about the world in which the nomadic Turkic people lived.  Animals feature prominently in most of the omens, sometimes domesticated animals such as horse and camels, and sometimes wild animals such as tigers and deer. When wild animals fight each other or are injured the omen is bad (nos.6, 8, 37, 43, 44, 45, 46, and 61).  Likewise, when domestic animals are mistreated, sick or stolen the omen is bad (nos. 16, 25, 39, 50, and 65). On the other hand, animals giving birth are good omens (nos. 5 and 41).  A couple of the omens show a threefold pattern of parallelism between two animals and a human: a white mare, a she-camel and a princess give birth (no. 5); young birds, fawns, and children get lost in the fog (no.15).

The Sky God Tengri is featured in some of the omens (no.12, 15, 17, 38, 41, 47, 54, 60), and he is normally shown to be benign, for instance rescuing lost or exhausted animals (nos. 15 and 17).  Also featured is the god of the road, who bestows his favour on travellers (no.2), and mends old things and brings order to the country (no.48).

The title Khan also features in several omens, establishing a royal camp (no.28), coming back from a victorious battle (no.34), and going hunting (no.63), which are all good omens.  Omen 63 mentions the custom of the khan killing an animal with his own hands after it has been surrounded by his retinue.

After the final divination, the book concludes, "Now, my dear sons, know thus: this book of divination is good. Thus everyone is master of his own fate."

The divination text is written in a mix of prose and poetry, and although it does not have a fixed poetic metre, it does exhibit poetic features such as stylistic parallelism, alliteration and rhyme.

See also 
 Turkic mythology
 Mo (divination)

Notes

References

External links 

Irk Bitig manuscript at the International Dunhuang Project
Transliteration with German glosses and parallel English translation
Runic font text with parallel transliteration and translation

British Library oriental manuscripts
Central Asian manuscripts
Divination
Uyghurs
Turkic languages
Chinese-language books